The Parina is a stream in the Bergamo Alps of northern Italy. It begins between the Pizzo Arera and the Cima Valmora, passes near the villages of Oltre il Colle, Serina, Dossena and Lenna, and after  flows into the Brembo river near Camerata Cornello.

Rivers of Italy
Rivers of Lombardy
Rivers of the Province of Bergamo